Wilks is a surname.

Wilks may also refer to:
another name for Cittarium pica, the Caribbean sea snail
Wilks Broadcasting, an American media company
Wilks Memorial Award, awarded by the American Statistical Association

See also
Wilkes (disambiguation)
Wilk (disambiguation)